The English Spy is the fifteenth in Daniel Silva's Gabriel Allon series. It was released on June 30, 2015 and reached the top of the New York Times bestseller list on July 19.  With the ever-changing political climate, he faces challenges in writing an Israeli protagonist.

With Allon and his team on the quest for the killer of a member of the British Royal Family, Silva acknowledged the parallels with Princess Diana.

References

External links
The English Spy

Novels by Daniel Silva
2015 American novels
HarperCollins books